Ashley Burdett (born 14 November 1994) is a Zimbabwean woman cricketer and former captain of the Zimbabwe women's national cricket team. She captained the Zimbabwe team in the 2013 ICC Women's World Twenty20 Qualifier which was also the inaugural edition of the ICC Women's World Twenty20 Qualifier.

Post-cricket, Burdett graduated from the Stellenbosch University and resides in South Africa.

References

External links 
 

1994 births
Living people
Zimbabwean women cricketers
Sportspeople from Masvingo
White Zimbabwean sportspeople
Stellenbosch University alumni